In for Winter, Out for Spring is a 1991 picture book by Arnold Adoff and illustrator Jerry Pinkney. It is a collection of 28 poems about a girl, Rebecca, and her experiences with her family over a year.

Reception
Booklist, in a review of In for Winter, Out for Spring, wrote "Adoff has worked with many fine illustrators, but never has his poetry been more radiantly expressed than in Pinkney's watercolor and colored-pencil art....  The poetry is formatted in eye-catching designs that encourage effective reading, whether by adults or by middle-graders who will be able to handle this themselves."

School Library Journal wrote "While the meanings are readily accessible, it will take sophisticated readers to read these poems alone.... These poems would be best read aloud and discussed."

In for Winter, Out for Spring has also been reviewed by Kirkus Reviews,  Publishers Weekly, and Texas Child Care Quarterly.

References

1991 children's books
1991 poetry books
American picture books
American poetry collections
Children's poetry books
Picture books by Jerry Pinkney